KMXI is a commercial radio station located in Chico, California, broadcasting on 95.1 FM.  KMXI airs an adult contemporary music format branded as "Today's Lite Rock Mix 95.1".

History
The station began in 1972 as KPAY-FM with a beautiful music format until 1987 when they shifted to an adult contemporary format. In April 1994 they changed their call letters to KMXI, now known as "Mix 95.1".

Personalities and shows
Dori in the Morning| Dori McKay | 6:00am–9:00am PST
No repeat Workday | Robin Scott | 9:00am–3:00pm PST
Drive At Five | Mark Chase | 3:00pm–7:00pm PST
TK Live | Tom Kent Radio Network | 7:00pm-midnight PST

External links

MXI
Mainstream adult contemporary radio stations in the United States
Radio stations established in 1972